Northampton Area High School is a public high school in the Northampton Area School District and located in Northampton, Pennsylvania in the Lehigh Valley metropolitan area of eastern Pennsylvania.  

As of the 2021-22 school year, the school had 1,868 students and 120.6 teachers on an FTE basis for a student-teacher ratio of 15.49, according to National Center for Education Statistics data. The high school was renovated in 2008 to help accommodate Northampton's growing population.

Academics and extracurricular activities
Northampton Area High School offers programs of studies in advanced placement, honors, college preparatory, applied academics, and vocational andtechnical studies through the Bethlehem Area Vocational-Technical School.  

Co-curricular activities round out academics and include athletics, mock trial club, band, chess team, chorus, debate, DECA, drama, FBLA, French club, Kids for Christ, Gay-Straight Alliance, German club, marching band, orchestra, peer helpers, Science Olympiad, Scholastic Scrimmage, Spanish club, student council, and yearbook.  There school newspaper is Koncrete Kourier. The peer helper program at the school has received national recognition and numerous awards for its focus on assisting students with special needs. At-risk, alternative education, Student Assistance Program (SAP), and counseling services are provided at the secondary level.

Athletics

Northampton Area High School competes athletically in the Eastern Pennsylvania Conference (EPC) in the District XI division of the Pennsylvania Interscholastic Athletic Association, one of the premier high school athletic divisions in the nation. The school's athletic teams are known as the "Konkrete Kids", which references Northampton's tradition as a large U.S. manufacturer of cement. The school is particularly well known for its successful wrestling program, which has periodically been ranked among the nation's best, and for its continuing football tradition with cross-town rival, Catasauqua High School. The tradition has been running for 92 years. The annual Turkey Day game is held on Thanksgiving. The Konkrete Kids have walked away victorious in the last Turkey Day game meeting and have a convincing lead in the series.

Northampton High School holds the record for the most Lehigh Valley Conference championships in girls tennis and wrestling. The school holds the fifth most Lehigh Valley Conference championships in all sports, behind Parkland High School, Emmaus High School, Easton Area High School and Allentown Central Catholic High School.

Northampton High School is widely known for having one of the best wrestling programs in the nation. Holding two national titles, seven PIAA state team championships and 21 individual state champions at various weight classes, Northampton is one of the leading schools in Pennsylvania state wrestling history.

The school's wrestling] team was ranked #1 in the nation in 1992-93 and 1993-94, #3 in the nation in the 2008-2009 season, #32 in the nation in 2016-17, and #23 in the nation in 2018-2019.

Pennsylvania state championships
Northampton has won PIAA state championships in the following sports and seasons:
Girls softball: 1996
Wrestling: 1993, 1994, 1995, 1998, 2000, 2003, 2004
Boys Swimming: 1993

District XI championships
Northampton has won PIAA District 11 championships in the following sports and seasons:
Baseball: 1938, 1963, 1968, 1982, 1986, 1989, 1997
Boys Basketball: 1937, 1972
Girls Basketball: 1995, 1997, 2010, 2011, 2019
Girls Cross Country: 1987
Golf. 2012
Softball: 1979, 1985, 1986, 1996, 2013, 2021, 2022
Girls Tennis: 2003, 2004
Boys Volleyball: 2022
Wrestling: 1953, 1988, 1993, 1994, 1998, 1999, 2008, 2009, 2019
Ping Pong: 2000, 2001

Eastern Conference Champions
Football: 2006
Ice Hockey: 2000, 2003, 2008, 2013
Baseball: 1997, 1998, 2019

Notable alumni
Jim Druckenmiller, former professional football player, Indianapolis Colts, Miami Dolphins, and San Francisco 49ers
Jenn Gotzon, actress, Tricia Nixon in Frost Nixon
Dennis Onkotz, former professional football player, New York Jets and 1995 College Football Hall of Fame inductee
Steve Pritko, former professional football player, Green Bay Packers, Los Angeles Rams, and New York Giants 
Brian Schneider, former professional baseball player, Montreal Expos, New York Mets and Philadelphia Phillies
Jennifer Storm, author, Blackout Girl: Growing Up and Drying Out in America and Leave the Light On
Walt Zirinsky, former professional football player, Cleveland Rams and 1945 NFL champion

References

External links 
Official website
Northampton Area High School athletics official website
Northampton Area High School on Facebook
Northampton Area High School on Twitter
Northampton Area High School athletics on Twitter
Northampton Area High School sports coverage at The Express-Times

Public high schools in Pennsylvania
Schools in Northampton County, Pennsylvania